The following is a summary of the Cavan county football team's 2020 season.

Dr McKenna Cup
The draw for the 2020 Dr McKenna Cup was made on 4 December 2019. Cavan were drawn in a group with Armagh and defending champions Tyrone.

Cavan finished bottom of their group, meaning they did not progress to a semi-final.

Table

Results

National Football League Division 2
As a result of their relegation in 2019, Cavan competed in Division Two of the 2020 National League. The fixtures were released on 26 November 2019.

The National League was suspended on 12 March with five rounds played, due to the COVID-19 pandemic. Games resumed in October and the league was finished.

Defeat to Roscommon on the final day meant Cavan were relegated for the second season in succession. They will compete in Division 3 in 2021.

Table

Results

Ulster Senior Football Championship
The draw for the 2020 Ulster Senior Football Championship was made on 9 October 2019, and pitted Cavan against Monaghan for the second successive year, with the winner facing Antrim in the quarter-finals.

The fixture was originally fixed for 10 May 2020. The game was later postponed due to the COVID-19 pandemic and was refixed for 31 October 2020.

Bracket

Results

All-Ireland Series
After their Ulster final victory, Cavan progressed to their first All-Ireland semi-final in 23 years, where they faced five-time defending champions Dublin. Dublin ended Cavan's championship run with a 1–24 to 0–12 victory.

Bracket

Results

References

Cavan county football team seasons